Michael Macdonald "Mike" Mooney (May 14, 1930 – November 18, 1985) was an American sailor and Olympic champion. He was born in New York City, New York and died in Washington, D.C.

He competed at the 1948 Summer Olympics in London, where he won a gold medal in the 6 metre class with the boat Uanoria, together with Herman Whiton, James Smith, Alfred Loomis and James Weekes.

References

External links
 
 
 

1930 births
1985 deaths
American male sailors (sport)
Olympic gold medalists for the United States in sailing
Sailors at the 1948 Summer Olympics – 6 Metre
Medalists at the 1948 Summer Olympics